Román Fernando Martínez Scharner (born 27 March 1983) is an Argentine footballer who plays as a midfielder.

Club career
Born in Morón, Buenos Aires, Martínez started his playing career with local Deportivo Morón in 2000. After several seasons playing in the third division, he joined Arsenal de Sarandí of the Primera División.

In 2006, Martínez dropped down to the second level to play for Club Atlético Tigre, but won promotion in his first season. The Apertura 2007 was the club's first year in the top flight since 1980, and the player appeared in nearly all of the team's matches helping to a final second-place finish, the highest in their history.

For the 2008–09 campaign, Martínez signed with Spain's RCD Espanyol. On 13 December 2008 he scored his first goal for the Catalans, in a 1–2 away loss to Valencia CF. Benefitting heavily from Iván de la Peña's constant injury problems, he featured regularly and netted in three consecutive wins in late April/early May 2009, all as a substitute: Sporting de Gijón (3–0), Real Betis (2–0) and again Valencia (3–0, finding the net after just two minutes).

Martínez was subsequently loaned for one season to CD Tenerife, which had returned to La Liga after seven years. In an irregular campaign, where he alternated starts with the bench, he scored four of his five league goals in the last seven matches – which granted the team six points, after wins against Gijón and Racing de Santander– but the Canary Islands side were finally relegated.

Martínez returned to Argentina for 2010–11, re-joining Tigre on a one-year loan.

Personal life
Martínez's younger brother, Nicolás, was also a footballer.

Career statistics

References

External links
 

Football-Lineups profile

1983 births
Living people
Argentine footballers
Argentine expatriate footballers
People from Morón Partido
Sportspeople from Buenos Aires Province
Association football midfielders
Argentine Primera División players
Primera Nacional players
Deportivo Morón footballers
Arsenal de Sarandí footballers
Club Atlético Tigre footballers
Estudiantes de La Plata footballers
Club Atlético Lanús footballers
San Lorenzo de Almagro footballers
Aldosivi footballers
Cañuelas footballers
Deportivo Riestra players
La Liga players
RCD Espanyol footballers
CD Tenerife players
Expatriate footballers in Spain
Argentine expatriate sportspeople in Spain